A list of American films released in 1997. 
Titanic became the highest-grossing film of all time to that point, and won the Academy Award for Best Picture.

Highest-grossing

# - A

B

C

D

E

F

G

H

I

J

K

L

M

N

O

P

Q

R

S

T

U

V

W

Y

Z

See also
 1997 in American television
 1997 in the United States

External links

 
 List of 1997 box office number-one films in the United States

1997
Films
Lists of 1997 films by country or language